Wynnedale is a town in Washington Township, Marion County, Indiana. The population was 231 at the 2010 census. It has existed as an "included town" since 1970, when it was incorporated into Indianapolis as part of Unigov. It is part of Indianapolis, but retains a functioning town government under IC 36-3-1-11.

Geography
Wynnedale is located at  (39.830742, -86.199268).

Demographics

2010 census
As of the census of 2010, there were 231 people, 96 households, and 71 families living in the town. The racial makeup of the town was 61.0% White, 35.9% African American, 1.3% Asian, 0.4% from other races, and 1.3% from two or more races. Hispanic or Latino of any race were 0.9% of the population.

There were 96 households, of which 26.0% had children under the age of 18 living with them, 67.7% were married couples living together, 6.3% had a female householder with no husband present, and 26.0% were non-families. 21.9% of all households were made up of individuals, and 13.5% had someone living alone who was 65 years of age or older. The average household size was 2.41 and the average family size was 2.83.

The median age in the town was 52.4 years. 19.9% of residents were under the age of 18; 1.3% were between the ages of 18 and 24; 14.2% were from 25 to 44; 39% were from 45 to 64; and 25.5% were 65 years of age or older. The gender makeup of the town was 48.1% male and 51.9% female.

2000 census
As of the census of 2000, there were 275 people, 108 households, and 84 families living in the town. The racial makeup of the town was 64.73% White, 33.09% African American, 0.36% Native American, 0.36% Asian, 1.45% from other races. Hispanic or Latino of any race were 1.45% of the population.

There were 108 households, out of which 31.5% had children under the age of 18 living with them, 67.6% were married couples living together, 7.4% had a female householder with no husband present, and 22.2% were non-families. 20.4% of all households were made up of individuals, and 8.3% had someone living alone who was 65 years of age or older. The average household size was 2.55 and the average family size was 2.82.

In the town, the population was spread out, with 21.1% under the age of 18, 3.6% from 18 to 24, 22.2% from 25 to 44, 32.7% from 45 to 64, and 20.4% who were 65 years of age or older. The median age was 48 years. For every 100 females, there were 111.5 males. For every 100 females age 18 and over, there were 104.7 males.

The median income for a household in the town was $93,778, and the median income for a family was $101,931. Males had a median income of $80,969 versus $32,344 for females. The per capita income for the town was $50,323. None of the families and 0.9% of the population were living below the poverty line, including no under eighteens and 4.5% of those over 64.

References

External links
 

Towns in Marion County, Indiana
Towns in Indiana
Indianapolis metropolitan area
Populated places established in 1939
1939 establishments in Indiana